Tango  is a 1998 Argentine-Spanish musical drama film written and directed by Carlos Saura and starring Miguel Ángel Solá and Mía Maestro. It was photographed by cinematographer Vittorio Storaro.

Plot
In Buenos Aires, Mario Suárez, a middle-aged theatre director, is left holed up in his apartment, licking his wounds when his girlfriend (and principal dancer) Laura leaves him. Seeking distraction, he throws himself into his next project, a musical about the tango. One evening, while meeting with his backers, he is introduced to a beautiful young woman, Elena, the girlfriend of his chief investor Angelo, a shady businessman with underworld connections.

Angelo asks Mario to audition Elena. He does so and is immediately captivated by her. Eventually, he takes her out of the chorus and gives her a leading role. An affair develops between them, but the possessive Angelo has her followed, and threatens her with dire consequences if she leaves him, mirroring Mario's own feelings and actions towards Laura before Elena entered his life.

The investors are unhappy with some of Mario's dance sequences. They don't like a routine which criticises the violent military repression and torture of the past. Angelo has been given a small part, which he takes very seriously. The lines between fact and fiction begin to blur: during a scene in the musical showing immigrants newly arrived in Argentina, two men fight over the character played by Elena. She is stabbed. Only slowly do we realise that her death is not for real.

Cast
 Miguel Ángel Solá as Mario Suárez
 Mía Maestro as Elena Flores
 Cecilia Narova as Laura Fuentes
 Juan Luis Galiardo as Angelo Larroca
 Juan Carlos Copes as Carlos Nebbia
 Carlos Rivarola as Ernesto Landi
 Sandra Ballesteros as María Elman
 Óscar Cardozo Ocampo as Daniel Stein
 Enrique Pinti as Sergio Lieman
 Julio Bocca as Julio Bocca
 Martín Seefeld as Andrés Castro

Production
Tango was shown out of competition at the 1998 Cannes Film Festival.

Accolades
Wins
 1998 - Goya Award for Best Sound.
 1998 - Grand Prix Technique de la CST (Vittorio Storaro) at the 1998 Cannes Film Festival.
 1998 - San Diego Film Critics Society Awards for Best Foreign Language Film

Nominations
 1998 - Academy Award Best Foreign Language Film by the Academy of Motion Picture Arts and Sciences.
 1998 - Golden Globe Award for Best Foreign Language Film.

Home media
Tango  was issued on DVD by Sony Pictures in August 1999, in Spanish with English subtitles.

See also
 List of submissions to the 71st Academy Awards for Best Foreign Language Film
 List of Argentine submissions for the Academy Award for Best Foreign Language Film

References

External links
 
 
 
  Tango at the cinenacional.com 

1998 films
Films directed by Carlos Saura
1990s musical drama films
Sony Pictures Classics films
Tango films
Films shot in Buenos Aires
Films scored by Lalo Schifrin
1990s dance films
1998 drama films
1990s Spanish-language films
1990s Spanish films
Argentine musical drama films
Spanish musical drama films